Tanvir Shakil Joy (born 1 August 1976) is a Bangladesh Awami League politician and a Jatiya Sangsad member representing the Sirajganj-1 constituency.

Career
In April 2007, illegal VoIP equipment allegedly owned by Joy were seized by Rapid Action Battalion from a house in Bashabo, Dhaka.

Joy was elected to Parliament in 2008 from Sirajganj-1 as a Bangladesh Awami League candidate.

In 2016, he was one of the organiser of a rally of Bangladeshi students protesting Islamic extremism.

After the death of Mohammed Nasim, his father, on 13 June 2020 Joy was elected as a Jatiya Sangsad member of the vacant seat in the by-election held on 12 Nov 2020.

Personal life
Joy's father, Mohammed Nasim, was an Awami League politician and former government minister.  His grandfather was Captain Muhammad Mansur Ali. Tanvir Shakil Joy was married in 2000 to Sabrina Sultana Chowdhury, a teacher in the Department of Mass Communication and Journalism at Dhaka University. He is the father of a daughter named Tapsi Joy Prathama.

References

Living people
1976 births
Awami League politicians
9th Jatiya Sangsad members
Place of birth missing (living people)
11th Jatiya Sangsad members